Michael D'Antonio (born May 19, 1973) is an American musician, best known as the bass guitarist and founder of Massachusetts metal band Killswitch Engage. He is also the founder and bassist of the bands Overcast and Death Ray Vision.

Career
D'Antonio's writing influences include old New York Hardcore bands like Cro-Mags, Leeway, Madball and Agnostic Front, and he cites Cliff Burton of thrash metal band Metallica and Harley Flanagan of the Cro-Mags as personal influences.

D'Antonio formed the band Killswitch Engage after the demise of his band Overcast in 1998.

All of Killswitch Engage's album artwork and tour merchandise is designed by D'Antonio, who is a graphic artist. D'Antonio's company, DarkicoN design, produces artwork for bands such as Shadows Fall, Unearth, All That Remains, New England Metal and Hardcore Fest and Crowbar.

D'Antonio's latest side project band is Death Ray Vision.

Equipment
D'Antonio uses his signature Ibanez basses and an EBS bass rig.

Discography

Overcast

 Expectational Dilution (1994)
 Fight Ambition to Kill (1997)
 Reborn to Kill Again (2008)

Killswitch Engage

 Killswitch Engage (2000)
 Alive or Just Breathing (2002)
 The End of Heartache (2004)
 As Daylight Dies (2006)
 Killswitch Engage (2009)
 Disarm the Descent (2013)
 Incarnate (2016)
 Atonement (2019)

Death Ray Vision 
 Get Lost or Get Dead (EP) (2011)
 We Ain't Leavin' Till You're Bleedin' (2013)
 Negative Mental Attitude (2018)
 No Mercy from Electric Eyes (2023)

References

External links
 Killswitch Engage official website Retrieved January 27, 2005.
 Ibanez Signature D'Antonio MDB1 Bass Guitar

External links

American heavy metal bass guitarists
American male bass guitarists
Living people
1973 births
Killswitch Engage members
21st-century American bass guitarists
21st-century American male musicians
20th-century American bass guitarists
20th-century American male musicians